Aleksandar Vlahović   (born 1969) is a retired Montenegrin footballer who played as a forward.

Club career
Vlahović began his senior career with Sutjeska Nikšić at the age of 17, and later played for Red Star Belgrade during the 1993–94 season.

In 1994, he joined Hammarby IF for the 1994 Allsvenskan season.

He played for Busan Daewoo Royals during the 1997 season in K League.

References

External links

1969 births
Living people
Yugoslav footballers
Montenegrin footballers
Serbia and Montenegro footballers
Serbia and Montenegro expatriate footballers
Association football forwards
FK Sutjeska Nikšić players
Red Star Belgrade footballers
FK Hajduk Kula players
Hammarby Fotboll players
Busan IPark players
Yugoslav First League players
First League of Serbia and Montenegro players
Allsvenskan players
K League 1 players
Expatriate footballers in Sweden
Expatriate footballers in South Korea
Serbia and Montenegro expatriate sportspeople in Sweden
Serbia and Montenegro expatriate sportspeople in South Korea